The Filchner Trough is an undersea trough extending north from its associated feature, the Filchner Ice Shelf. The name, proposed by Heinrich Hinze of the Alfred Wegener Institute for Polar and Marine Research, Bremerhaven, Germany, was approved by the Advisory Committee for Undersea Features in June 1997.

References 

Oceanic basins of the Southern Ocean
Filchner-Ronne Ice Shelf